Swen Erick Nater (born January 14, 1950) is a Dutch former professional basketball player. He played primarily in the American Basketball Association (ABA) and National Basketball Association (NBA), and is the only player to have led both the NBA and ABA in rebounding. Nater was a two-time ABA All-Star and was the 1974 ABA Rookie of the Year. He played college basketball for the UCLA Bruins, winning two National Collegiate Athletic Association (NCAA) titles.

Early life
Nater was born in the Netherlands in Den Helder. His parents divorced when he was three years old. When his mother remarried and the family's economic situation deteriorated, she, her husband, and Nater's younger brother moved to the United States, leaving Nater and his sister in an orphanage. After three years it appeared they would remain in the Netherlands until a television show, It Could Be You (a forerunner to This Is Your Life), discovered the situation and brought the two siblings to America to be reunited—on TV—with the rest of the family. At age nine, he was in a new country and did not speak a word of English. He took his stepfather's name and was known as Swen Langeberg.

Nater did not get along with his stepfather, who did not want him to play basketball. Nater graduated from Long Beach Wilson High School in Long Beach, California. He tried out for their basketball team as a junior, but he was cut. He had arrived at the first practice barefoot but was told by the coach he needed shoes. His family unable to afford them, Nater returned to practice with shoes stolen from a teammate. The coach told Nater to leave. He did not try out as a senior.

College career
Nater attended and played basketball at Cypress College, a junior college in Cypress, California (where he met his wife, Marlene). He played little as a freshman, but was a Community College All-American as a sophomore. He earned a scholarship to UCLA. After leaving Cypress, he changed back to his father's name, Nater.  He had already moved out from his stepfather's home after he forbade Nater from playing at Cypress.

Nater redshirted his first year with the UCLA Bruins. He helped John Wooden's squads win two NCAA titles. He was a backup to Bill Walton, and averaged just 3.2 points and 3.3 rebounds per game as a senior. He never started a collegiate game—his primary role was helping to develop Walton in practice.

Professional career
Nater was drafted by The Floridians in the 1972 ABA Draft, and then by the Virginia Squires in the June 1972 ABA dispersal draft after the Floridians' demise. Nater was also drafted in the first round of the 1973 NBA draft with the 16th overall pick by the Milwaukee Bucks; he was the first NBA first-round pick to have played in the NCAA without ever starting a college game. Milwaukee offered him $50,000. In August 1973, he opted to sign a three-year, $300,000 contract with the Squires, who spread the payments over seven years. On November 21, 1973, the Squires traded Nater to the San Antonio Spurs for a draft pick and $300,000.

With the Spurs, Nater was the ABA Rookie of the Year after averaging 14.1 points and 12.6 rebounds for the season. He led the ABA in field goal percentage in 1974 and led the league in rebounding in 1975. He was named to the All-ABA Second Team in 1974 and 1975 and participated in the ABA All-Star Game both seasons. During his three seasons in the ABA, Nater played for the Spurs, Squires, and the New York Nets.

Nater's NBA career began with the Milwaukee Bucks. During the 1976-77 NBA season, Nater amassed three games where he had at least 20 rebounds and 20 points, including a 30 point and 33 rebound performance in a 126-109 win over the Atlanta Hawks on December 19, 1976. After the season ended, Milwaukee traded Nater to the Buffalo Braves for Buffalo's first round draft pick, which Milwaukee used to select Marques Johnson. When the Braves moved to San Diego and became the Clippers a year later, Nater became a local favorite. Nater led the NBA in rebounding average during the 1979–80 season, making him the only player ever to lead both the NBA and ABA in rebounding. On January 12, 1982, he had surgery to remove bone chips from his right knee. The injury limited him to just 14 games in 1981–82 and seven in 1982–83.

Before the 1983–84 season, Nater was traded by the Clippers along with a just-drafted Byron Scott to the Los Angeles Lakers for Norm Nixon, Eddie Jordan, and a 1986 second-round draft pick (which would eventually be dealt to the Phoenix Suns and become Jeff Hornacek). The Lakers acquired him to backup Kareem Abdul Jabbar. Nater and Scott helped lead the Lakers to the NBA Finals that year, but the next season the team did not offer him a guaranteed contract.

Nater played for Australian Udine in the Italian League, where he was the best paid player and led the league in rebounding even though the team ended up being relegated. The next season, he initially accepted an offer from Barcelona in the Spanish League, but ultimately he changed his mind and decided to retire.

Career statistics

ABA

Regular season

|-
| align="left" | 1973–74
| align="left" | Virginia
| 17 || - || 22.0 || .556 || .000 || .630 || 9.1 || 1.0 || 0.4 || 0.9 || 12.6
|-
| align="left" | 1973–74
| align="left" | San Antonio
| 62 || - || 32.3 || .551 || .000 || .740 || 13.6 || 1.8 || 0.4 || 0.8 || 14.5
|-
| align="left" | 1974–75
| align="left" | San Antonio
| 78 || - || 34.8 || .542 || .000 || .752 || style="background:#cfecec;" | 16.4* || 1.2 || 0.6 || 1.1 || 15.1
|-
| align="left" | 1975–76
| align="left" | New York
| 43 || - || 23.6 || .485 || .000 || .718 || 10.3 || 0.4 || 0.4 || 0.6 || 8.7
|-
| align="left" | 1975–76
| align="left" | Virginia
| 33 || - || 23.5 || .498 || .000 || .675 || 9.8 || 1.1 || 0.4 || 0.8 || 11.3
|- class="sortbottom"
| style="text-align:center;" colspan="2"| Career
| 233 || - || 29.5 || .532 || .000 || .722 || 13.1 || 1.2 || 0.5 || 0.9 || 13.0
|}

Playoffs

|-
| align="left" | 1973–74
| align="left" | San Antonio
| 7 || - || 30.1 || .553 || .000 || .714 || 11.7 || 2.1 || 0.4 || 0.7 || 14.9
|-
| align="left" | 1974–75
| align="left" | San Antonio
| 6 || - || 39.0 || .476 || .000 || .429 || 16.5 || 1.0 || 0.2 || 1.0 || 14.8
|- class="sortbottom"
| style="text-align:center;" colspan="2"| Career
| 13 || - || 25.0 || .475 || .244 || .846 || 3.5 || 2.4 || 0.8 || 0.3 || 13.6
|}

NBA

Regular season

|-
| align="left" | 1976–77
| align="left" | Milwaukee
| 72 || - || 27.2 || .528 || - || .754 || 12.0 || 1.5 || 0.8 || 0.7 || 13.0
|-
| align="left" | 1977–78
| align="left" | Buffalo
| 78 || - || 35.6 || .504 || - || .765 || 13.2 || 2.8 || 0.5 || 0.6 || 15.5
|-
| align="left" | 1978–79
| align="left" | San Diego
| 79 || - || 25.4 || .569 || - || .800 || 8.9 || 1.8 || 0.5 || 0.4 || 10.7
|-
| align="left" | 1979–80
| align="left" | San Diego
| 81 || - || 35.3 || .554 || .000 || .718 || style="background:#cfecec;" | 15.0* || 2.9 || 0.6 || 0.5 || 13.4
|-
| align="left" | 1980–81
| align="left" | San Diego
| 82 || - || 34.3 || .553 || .000 || .795 || 12.4 || 2.4 || 0.6 || 0.6 || 15.6
|-
| align="left" | 1981–82
| align="left" | San Diego
| 21 || 7 || 27.4 || .577 || 1.000 || .747 || 9.1 || 1.4 || 0.3 || 0.4 || 12.5
|-
| align="left" | 1982–83
| align="left" | San Diego
| 7 || 0 || 7.3 || .300 || .000 || 1.000 || 1.9 || 0.1 || 0.1 || 0.0 || 2.3
|-
| align="left" | 1983–84
| align="left" | Los Angeles
| 69 || 0 || 12.0 || .490 || .000 || .692 || 3.8 || 0.4 || 0.4 || 0.1 || 4.5
|- class="sortbottom"
| style="text-align:center;" colspan="2"| Career
| 489 || 7 || 28.4 || .537 || .250 || .760 || 10.8 || 2.0 || 0.5 || 0.5 || 12.2
|}

Playoffs

|-
| align="left" | 1983–84
| align="left" | Los Angeles
| 17 || - || 8.6 || .500 || .000 || .769 || 2.4 || 0.1 || 0.1 || 0.1 || 3.4
|}

After the NBA
He built the basketball program at Christian Heritage College in San Diego, California, and coached from 1985 to 1995. He left the position because it "was high on work and low on pay.” He was living in El Cajon, California, where his two daughters were born and raised.

Nater later lived in Enumclaw, Washington, where he went to work for Costco, for whom he was a sporting goods assistant buyer. and then in Des Moines, Washington overlooking Puget Sound, with his wife Dr. Wendy Ghiora.

Nater has also co-authored books with basketball coaches Wooden and Pete Newell.

Publications

See also

List of National Basketball Association annual rebounding leaders
List of National Basketball Association single-game rebounding leaders

References

External links

1950 births
Living people
Buffalo Braves players
Cypress Chargers men's basketball players
Dutch expatriate basketball people in the United States
Lega Basket Serie A players
Los Angeles Lakers players
Miami Floridians draft picks
Milwaukee Bucks draft picks
Milwaukee Bucks players
National Basketball Association players from the Netherlands
New York Nets players
Pallalcesto Amatori Udine players
People from Den Helder
People from Des Moines, Washington
People from Enumclaw, Washington
Power forwards (basketball)
San Antonio Spurs players
San Diego Clippers players
Sportspeople from King County, Washington
UCLA Bruins men's basketball players
Virginia Squires draft picks
Virginia Squires players
Wilson Classical High School alumni
Sportspeople from North Holland